The Women's 3 balls & 2 ropes gymnastics at the 2017 Summer Universiade in Taipei was held on 29 August at the Taipei Nangang Exhibition Center.

Schedule 
All times are Taiwan Standard Time (UTC+08:00).

Results

References

Women's rhythmic group 3 balls + 2 ropes